Amlabad is a census town in the Chandankiyari CD blocks in the Chas subdivision of the Bokaro district  in the state of Jharkhand, India.

Geography

Location

Area overview
Bokaro district consists of undulating uplands on the Chota Nagpur Plateau with the Damodar River cutting a valley right across. The East Bokaro Coalfield located in the Bermo-Phusro area and small intrusions of Jharia Coalfield make Bokaro a coal rich district. In 1965, one of the largest steel manufacturing units in the country, Bokaro Steel Plant, operated by Steel Authority of India Limited, was set-up at Bokaro Steel City. The Damodar Valley Corporation established its first thermal power station at Bokaro (Thermal). The soil is generally infertile and agriculture is mostly rain-fed.

Note: The map alongside presents some of the notable locations in the district. All places marked in the map are linked in the larger full screen map.

Demographics
According to the 2011 Census of India, Amlabad had a total population of 4,636, of which 2,477 (53%) were males and 2,159 (49%) were females. Population in the age range 0–6 years was 572. The total number of literate persons in Amlabad was 3,078 (75.74% of the population over 6 years).

 India census, Amlabad had a population of 4,723. Males constitute 55% of the population and females 45%. Amlabad has an average literacy rate of 66%, higher than the national average of 59.5%; with 64% of the males and 36% of females literate. 13% of the population is under 6 years of age.

Infrastructure
According to the District Census Handbook 2011, Bokaro, Amlabad  covered an area of 2.89 km2. Among the civic amenities, it had 14 km roads with open drains, the protected water supply involved tapwater from treated and untreated sources, overhead tank. It had 868 domestic electric connections, 120 road lighting points. Among the medical facilities, it had 30 hospitals, 3 dispensaries, 3 health centres, 30 family welfare centres, 30 maternity and child welfare centres, 30 maternity homes, 30 nursing homes, no medicine shops. Among the educational facilities it had 3 primary schools, 1 middle school, the nearest secondary school, senior secondary school at Bhojudih 9 km away. Among the social, recreational and cultural facilities it had 1 auditorium/ community hall. It had the branch office of 1 nationalised bank.

Economy

Amlabad Project which is a colliery in the Eastern Jharia Area of Bharat Coking Coal Limited has reserves of 45.94 million tonnes of coal (as in 2015).

Collieries functioning in the Eastern Jharia Area of BCCL are: Bhowrah North, Bhowrah South, Bhowrah (OC 3 Pit), Amlabad, Sudamdih Incline, Sudamdih Shafts, Pathardih and C.O.C.R.

Note: In the map alongside the places marked are NOT linked because collieries/ washeries do not have separate pages

References

Cities and towns in Bokaro district